Thorpe in Balne is a village and civil parish in the Metropolitan Borough of Doncaster in South Yorkshire, England.  It had a population of 176 at the 2001 census, increasing to 203 at the 2011 Census.

A moated site with a chapel and a fishpond near the manor house is a Grade II* listed monument. The chapel once served as the village church. Another moated site in the civil parish is located at Tilts.

Residents of Thorpe in Balne were asked to evacuate their homes during the 2019 United Kingdom floods.

See also
Listed buildings in Thorpe in Balne

References

Villages in Doncaster
Civil parishes in South Yorkshire